Verona van de Leur (born 27 December 1985) is a retired Dutch artistic gymnast and adult film performer. She was named Dutch Sportswoman of the Year in 2002 after winning the all-around silver medal at that year's European championships and the silver medal on floor exercise at the world championships.

Van de Leur retired from gymnastics in 2008, after which she suffered personal difficulties, including a conviction for blackmail and a prison sentence. She began performing in adult webcam shows and then in adult films.

Biography 
Van de Leur, born in Gouda, South Holland, the Netherlands, began with gymnastic at 5 years of age at gym T.O.O.S. Waddinxveen. At the age of 9, she started to train at Pro Patria in Zoetermeer.

Her first national appearance was at the Dutch National Championship in 2000. She was the junior Dutch all-around champion and won three event finals. One year later, in 2001, she was the Dutch all-around women's champion. With the Dutch team she surprising took the fifth place in the World Championship in Ghent. This performance made them the Dutch sports team of the year 2001.

2002 was Van de Leur's break-out year on the international stage. She won five medals at the European Championship in Patras, Greece, including silver medals in the team competition, the all-around (behind Svetlana Khorkina) and on beam. She also won a bronze medal on floor exercise. Many believe Verona should have won gold on the floor exercise finals, due to a judging error that cost Van de Leur 1/10 of a point, dropping her to 3rd place. Van der Leur then won silver on the floor exercise at the World Championships in Debrecen, Hungary, and gold at the World Cup Finals on the same apparatus. She was elected 2002 Dutch Sportswoman of the Year and once again they were sports team of the year.

Van de Leur and Renske Endel were drawn as a reserve for the World Cup of 2003 in Anaheim and the Dutch team was not placed among the top twelve. Therefore, the gymnast didn't qualify for the Olympics in Athens. Then it came to a rift between her coach Frank and Van de Leur, leading her to move to The Hazenkamp in Nijmegen, the club of trainer Boris Orlov. In 2007, Van de Leur won the Dutch all-around champions for the fourth time. At the National Championships in Nijmegen she also won gold on beam and floor exercise and bronze on bars.

On 19 June 2008, Van de Leur publicly announced her retirement from gymnastics. Conflicts with the gymnastics federation and a lack of motivation also caused by a problematic situation at home, have reportedly played an important role in her decision.

Legal problems
In early May 2011, Van de Leur was convicted of blackmailing an adulterous couple she had been following.  She served 72 days in prison.

Adult performances 
After being homeless for two years and in jail, Van de Leur saw a way out in late October 2011 with the adult film industry. She decided to work as a webcam girl and then started her own adult website, which includes adult films. She only worked with her boyfriend and quit as an adult performer in November 2019.

Competitive history

In culture
Van de Leur is the subject of the song Verona van de Leur by Ellen ten Damme

References

External links 
 
 Company website

1985 births
Living people
Dutch female artistic gymnasts
Medalists at the World Artistic Gymnastics Championships
Sportspeople from Gouda, South Holland
People convicted of blackmail
Dutch pornographers
Dutch pornographic film actresses